Tarazuj or Tarazooj or Tarazowj or Tarazzuj may refer to:
 Tarazuj, Ardabil
 Tarazuj, Zanjan